Union of Lublin Mound is an artificial hill, 29 m high, in Lviv, modern day Ukraine created in 1869-1890 by Polish inhabitants to commemorate the 300th anniversary of the Union of Lublin by initiative and with financial support of Franciszek Smolka. It is located on  the summit of Lviv High Castle.

There is an observation platform at the top of the mound (altitude 413 m), offering a vantage viewpoint over Lviv.

References

Buildings and structures in Lviv
Monuments and memorials in Ukraine
Commemorative mounds
Tourist attractions in Lviv
1890 establishments in Austria-Hungary